Log Kya Kahenge is a social slogan in Urdu and Hindi used in India and Pakistan to create fear of public's opinion on one's personal life. 

Log Kya Kahenge or Log Kia Kahenge may also refer to:

 Log Kya Kahenge (film), a 1982 Indian Bollywood film 
 Log Kia Kahenge (2019 TV series), a 2019 Pakistani television soap opera
 Log Kya Kahenge (2020 TV series), a 2020 Pakistani television series